General McNeil or McNeill may refer to:

Clarence H. McNeil (1873–1947), U.S. Army major general
John McNeil (1813 – June 8, 1891), Union Army brigadier general and brevet major general
John McNeil Jr. (1784–1850), U.S. Army brevet brigadier general
Joseph McNeil (born 1942), U.S. Air Force major general
Dan K. McNeill (born 1946), U.S. Army four-star general
John McNeill (British Army officer) (1831–1904), British Army major general
Hugo MacNeill (Irish Army officer) (1900–1963), Irish National Army major general